San Bernardino District may refer to:

 San Bernardino District, Paraguay, in the Cordillera Department
 San Bernardino District, San Pablo, Peru

See also 
 San Bernardino (disambiguation)